Nicholas Kommer (born 28 September 1990) is a former professional Australian rules footballer who played for the Essendon Football Club in the Australian Football League (AFL). 
Kommer was recruited from East Perth in the West Australian Football League (WAFL), he was selected by Essendon with the seventy-third overall pick in the 2012 national draft. He made his AFL debut in the season-opening game against  in 2013. He was delisted at the end of the 2016 season.

Statistics

|- style="background-color: #EAEAEA"
! scope="row" style="text-align:center" | 2013
|
| 38 || 19 || 10 || 8 || 114 || 103 || 217 || 55 || 62 || 0.5 || 0.4 || 6.0 || 5.4 || 11.4 || 2.9 || 3.3
|-
! scope="row" style="text-align:center" | 2014
|
| 38 || 0 || — || — || — || — || — || — || — || — || — || — || — || — || — || —
|- style="background-color: #EAEAEA"
! scope="row" style="text-align:center" | 2015
|
| 38 || 0 || — || — || — || — || — || — || — || — || — || — || — || — || — || —
|-
! scope="row" style="text-align:center" | 2016
|
| 38 || 3 || 3 || 1 || 12 || 14 || 26 || 8 || 5 || 1.0 || 0.3 || 4.0 || 4.7 || 8.7 || 2.7 || 1.7
|- class="sortbottom"
! colspan=3| Career
! 22
! 13
! 9
! 126
! 117
! 243
! 63
! 67
! 0.6
! 0.4
! 5.7
! 5.3
! 11.0
! 2.9
! 3.0
|}

References

External links

WAFL playing statistics

Living people
1990 births
Essendon Football Club players
East Perth Football Club players
Australian rules footballers from Western Australia
East Fremantle Football Club players